The NhaC family (TC# 2.A.35) belongs to the Ion Transporter (IT) Superfamily. A representative list of proteins belonging to the NhaC family can be found in the Transporter Classification Database.

Two members of the NhaC family have been functionally characterized. One is believed to be a Na+:H+ antiporter; the other is a malate·H+:lactate·Na+ antiporter. Several paralogues are found in Vibrio cholerae, and two paralogues are found encoded in the completely sequenced genomes of bothHaemophilus influenzae and Bacillus subtilis. E. coli lacks such a homologue. Pyrococcus species also have at least one homologue each. Thus, members of the NhaC family are found in both Gram-negative bacteria and Gram-positive bacteria as well as archaea. NhaC of B. firmus is 462 amino acyl residues long and possesses 12 putative transmembrane α-helical segments. MleN of B. subtilis (468 aas; TC# 2.A.35.1.2) also exhibits 12 putative TMSs.

The transport reaction catalyzed by NhaC is probably:Na+ (in) + nH+ (out) ⇌ Na+ (out) + nH+ (in). (n > 1)That catalyzed by MleN is probably:Malate (out) + H+ (out) + Lactate (in) + Na+ (in) ⇌ Malate (in) + H+ (in) + Lactate (out) + Na+ (out)

See also 
 Sodium-Proton antiporter
 Antiporter
 Transporter Classification Database

Further reading 
 Ivey, D. M.; Guffanti, A. A.; Bossewitch, J. S.; Padan, E.; Krulwich, T. A. (1991-12-05). "Molecular cloning and sequencing of a gene from alkaliphilic Bacillus firmus OF4 that functionally complements an Escherichia coli strain carrying a deletion in the nhaA Na+/H+ antiporter gene". The Journal of Biological Chemistry 266 (34): 23483–23489. ISSN 0021-9258. PMID 1660475.
 Liew, Chong Wai; Illias, Rosli Md; Mahadi, Nor Muhammad; Najimudin, Nazalan (2007-11-01)."Expression of the Na+/H+ antiporter gene (g1-nhaC) of alkaliphilic Bacillus sp. G1 in Escherichia coli". FEMS Microbiology Letters 276 (1): 114–122. doi:10.1111/j.1574-6968.2007.00925.x. ISSN 0378-1097. PMID 17937670.
 Panina, Ekaterina M.; Vitreschak, Alexey G.; Mironov, Andrey A.; Gelfand, Mikhail S. (2003-05-28)."Regulation of biosynthesis and transport of aromatic amino acids in low-GC Gram-positive bacteria". FEMS Microbiology Letters 222 (2): 211–220. ISSN 0378-1097.PMID 12770710.
 Ravcheev, Dmitry A.; Best, Aaron A.; Tintle, Nathan; Dejongh, Matthew; Osterman, Andrei L.; Novichkov, Pavel S.; Rodionov, Dmitry A. (2011-07-01)."Inference of the transcriptional regulatory network in Staphylococcus aureus by integration of experimental and genomics-based evidence". Journal of Bacteriology 193(13): 3228–3240. doi:10.1128/JB.00350-11. ISSN 1098-5530. PMC 3133287. PMID 21531804.
 Rodionov, Dmitry A.; Hebbeln, Peter; Eudes, Aymerick; ter Beek, Josy; Rodionova, Irina A.; Erkens, Guus B.; Slotboom, Dirk J.; Gelfand, Mikhail S.; Osterman, Andrei L. (2009-01-01). "A novel class of modular transporters for vitamins in prokaryotes". Journal of Bacteriology 191 (1): 42–51. doi:10.1128/JB.01208-08.ISSN 1098-5530. PMC 2612444. PMID 18931129.

References 

Protein families
Membrane proteins
Transmembrane proteins
Transmembrane transporters
Transport proteins
Integral membrane proteins